Grindelia (gumweed) is a genus of plants native to the Americas belonging to the family Asteraceae. The genus was named for Latvian botanist David Hieronymus Grindel, 1776–1836.

They are herbaceous plants or subshrubs with annual, biennial, or perennial life cycles. The flowerheads are composed of numerous yellow disc florets (usually between 100–200) and from zero to sixty or more yellow or orange ray florets. Grindelia squarrosa, a plant with bright yellow flowers indigenous to much of the United States, is commonly called curlycup gumweed. Grindelia robusta, found in the western states, is a coastal scrub bush that is reputed to have several medicinal uses. Hairy gumweed, Grindelia cuneifolia, occurs in brackish coastal marshes of western North America, such as in some portions of the San Francisco Bay perimeter. The genus is native to South America, Mexico, and western North America, though some species have been introduced and naturalized in eastern North America and the Old World.

Grindelia species are used as food plants by the larvae of some Lepidoptera species including Schinia mortua.

Species
There are many species, including:

References

External links
 

 
Asteraceae genera